Sar Taq or Sartaq may refer to:

Sartaq, Golestan
Sar Taq, Lorestan
Sar Taq, Markazi